Jeff Rabkin (born 1958 in South Africa) is a former Israel international bowls player.

Bowls career
Born in South Africa he started playing aged 18 and after emigrating to Israel in 1985 he won the Israeli national title seven times and the masters sixteen times and in February 2000 he reached a career high ranking of world number one. 

He has won three medals in the singles event at consecutive World Bowls Championships; he won a bronze medal in 1992 World Outdoor Bowls Championship in Worthing followed by a silver medal at the 1996 World Outdoor Bowls Championship in Adelaide and a bronze medal at the 2000 World Outdoor Bowls Championship in Johannesburg.

In 1993, he won the Hong Kong International Bowls Classic pairs title with Cecil Bransky.

References

Israeli male bowls players
Living people
1958 births